Melville United AFC is an amateur football club in Melville, Hamilton, New Zealand. It competes in the Northern League.

History
The club was formed in 1996 from the merger of Melville AFC (founded 1972) and Waikato United (founded 1988). The team play at Gower Park, which was previously home to Melville United, and before that Melville AFC. Waikato United had itself been formed as the result of a merger between several local clubs, most notably former Chatham Cup winners Hamilton Technical Old Boys.

Current squad

See also
Northern League
Chatham Cup
New Zealand Football
Waikato United

References

External links
Club website

Association football clubs in Hamilton, New Zealand
Association football clubs established in 1972
Association football clubs established in 1996
1972 establishments in New Zealand
1996 establishments in New Zealand